Crotone is a railway station in Crotone, Italy. The station is located on the Jonica railway . The train services are operated by Trenitalia.

Train services
The station is served by the following service(s):

Intercity services Taranto - Sibari - Crotone - Catanzaro Lido - Roccella Jonica - Reggio Calabria
Regional services (Treno regionale) Sibari - Crotone - Cantanzaro Lido

References

This article is based upon a translation of the Italian language version as at November 2014.

Railway stations in Calabria
Buildings and structures in the Province of Crotone
Railway stations opened in 1875